Charles Cameron may refer to:

 Charles Cameron (architect) (1743–1812), Scottish architect who worked in Russia
 Charles Cameron (colonial administrator) (1766–1820), British officer and Governor of the Bahamas, 1804–20
 Charles Cameron (cricketer) (1819–?), Irish cricketer
 Charlie Cameron (footballer, born 1886) (1886–1957), Australian rules footballer who played for South Melbourne and Geelong
 Charles Cameron (footballer, born 1907) (1907–1960), Australian rules footballer who played for North Melbourne and Fitzroy
 Charlie Cameron (footballer, born 1874) (1874–1936), Australian rules footballer who played for Fitzroy
 Charlie Cameron (footballer, born 1994), Australian rules footballer who plays for the Brisbane Lions
 Charles Cameron (magician) (1927–2001), Scottish magician
 Sir Charles Cameron, 1st Baronet (1841–1924), Member of Parliament for Glasgow 1874–1885, Glasgow College 1885–1895, Glasgow Bridgeton 1897–1900
 Charles Cameron (physician) (1830–1921), Irish chemist, physician and writer
 Charles Duncan Cameron (died 1870), British soldier serving as British consul in Ethiopia
 Charles Hay Cameron (1795–1880), jurist
 Charles Cameron (author), wrote Who is Guru Maharaj Ji?
 Charles Cameron (army officer) (1779–1827), achieved the rank of lieutenant-colonel, Commandant at Port Dalrymple, Tasmania
 Charles R. Cameron (1875–1946), member of the United States Foreign Service